Hatyara may refer to:
 Hatyara (1977 film), a Hindi action crime film
 Hatyara (1998 film), an Indian Hindi-language crime film